Hanggang sa Dulo ng Buhay Ko (International title: Obsession / ) is a 2019 Philippine television drama horror series broadcast by GMA Network. Directed by Jorron Lee Monroy, it stars Kris Bernal, Rayver Cruz, Kim Domingo and Megan Young. It premiered on July 22, 2019 on the network's Afternoon Prime and Sabado Star Power sa Hapon line up replacing Dragon Lady. The series concluded on October 19, 2019, with a total of 78 episodes. It was replaced by Magkaagaw in its timeslot.

Originally titled as The Haunted Wife, it was later renamed to Hanggang sa Dulo ng Buhay Ko. The series is streaming online on YouTube.

Premise
Yvie Cardeñas and Matteo Divinagracia are childhood sweethearts who fall in love and eventually get married. They happily moved into their new family home, along with their adopted son and Yvie's cousin, Katya Calderon. Matteo's former girlfriend, Naomi Espiritu will put fear into their lives and disrupt their lives.

Cast and characters

Lead cast
 Kris Bernal as Naomi Espiritu
 Rayver Cruz as Matteo Divinagracia
 Kim Domingo as Katherine “Katya” De Jesus Calderon / Naomi Espiritu
 Megan Young as Yvette “Yvie” Cardeñas-Divinagracia

Supporting cast
 Boots Anson-Roa as Adora "Abuela" Divinagracia
 Sharmaine Arnaiz as Valentina "Tina" De Jesus-Cardeñas
 Francine Prieto as Mercedes "Mercy" De Jesus-Calderon
 Beverly Salviejo as Vanessa "Vane" Espiritu
 Euwenn Aleta as Santino "Santy" Cardeñas Divinagracia / Matteo Espiritu Divinagracia Jr.
 Denise Barbacena as Brooke 
 Analyn Barro as Tyra Espiritu
 Joaquin Manansala as Paul
 Rob Moya as Bob

Guest cast
 Gileth Sandico as Mariana
 Patricia Javier as Loida
 Rodjun Cruz as Ben
 Patani Daño as Trinity
 Kevin Sagra as Carlson
 Hannah Precillas as Nina
 Boboy Garovillo as Daryl
 Rodolfo Muyuela as Kulas
 Patricia Tumulak as Michelle
 Rey PJ Abellana as Ross
 Cherry Malvar	as Pearl
 Marlon Mance as Darius
 Bryan Benedict as Bustamante
 Visam Arenas as Gino
 Andrew Ferrer as Kicks

Ratings
According to AGB Nielsen Philippines' Nationwide Urban Television Audience Measurement People in television homes, the series got its highest rating on July 24, 2019 with a 5.7% rating.

Accolades

References

External links
 
 

2019 Philippine television series debuts
2019 Philippine television series endings
Filipino-language television shows
GMA Network drama series
Philippine horror fiction television series
Television shows set in the Philippines